Friant Dam is a concrete gravity dam on the San Joaquin River in central California in the United States, on the boundary of Fresno and Madera Counties. It was built between 1937 and 1942 as part of a U.S. Bureau of Reclamation (USBR) water project to provide irrigation water to the southern San Joaquin Valley.

Background
The valley in which Friant Dam and Millerton Lake now lie was once the location of the historic town of Millerton. Millerton was the first county seat of Fresno County. In 1880, the first dam on the San Joaquin River was constructed by the Upper San Joaquin Irrigation Company roughly on the present site of Friant Dam. The project was abandoned in the wake of floods that destroyed the dam two years later.

Friant Dam was originally proposed in the 1930s as a main feature of the Central Valley Project (CVP), a federal water project that would involve building an expansive system of dams and canals on the rivers of the Central Valley to provide water for agriculture, with secondary purposes of flood control, municipal supply, and hydroelectric power generation. The CVP was authorized by the 1935 Rivers and Harbors Act, while $20 million of initial funding for Friant Dam was provided by the Emergency Relief Appropriation Act of 1935.

Initial surveys of the Friant Dam site were carried out in November 1935 and continued through early 1936. In January 1938, a worker's camp was established near the town of Friant to house the laborers that would ultimately work on the dam. In the middle of the Great Depression, the Friant Dam site saw a huge influx of job seekers, many of whom had to live further away in surrounding cities. More than 50,000 people attended the groundbreaking of the dam on November 5, 1939 in a celebration that is now known as "one of the greatest in San Joaquin Valley history".

Construction
Before any concrete was laid on the dam's main wall, the underlying rock was extensively grouted to fill in 725 holes and seams that might otherwise cause instability in the foundation. In July 1940, the San Joaquin River was diverted through a wooden flume so that work on the foundations could begin.

On July 29, the first concrete was poured into the main body of Friant Dam. In order to keep the structure in line, the dam was built in a series of blocks or forms, each measuring  square. Two gantry cranes lifted the buckets from the cars and poured them onto the forms.

During the dam's construction several Native American burial sites had their graves removed and re-interred.

The workforce scrambled to complete the main wall of the dam after an act of the War Production Board (WPB) suspended resources in order to assist U.S. military efforts in World War II. The dam was topped out on June 16, 1942, just under two years after the first concrete was poured. However, the spillway gates, the water release valves and the two irrigation canals Friant was intended to support remained unfinished in the wake of the WPB's order.

The war, however, did not completely halt construction. Less than a year later, the WPB "[determined] the completion of the Madera Canal and the installation of valves at the Friant Dam, necessary for war-time food and fiber production" – allowing construction to resume on a limited scale. A pair of control valves were borrowed from Hoover Dam, allowing the closure of the river outlets and Millerton Lake began to fill on February 21, 1944. Work on the Madera Canal, the smaller of the two irrigation canals serviced by Friant Dam (the other, the Friant-Kern Canal, would not be completed for another four years), was completed in 1945 and water ran for its entire length for the first time on June 10, with irrigation deliveries commencing one month later.

The dam was formally dedicated on July 9, 1949 by California governor Earl Warren, who declared that the water furnished by Friant Dam and its canals would help the San Joaquin Valley to "become a modern Eden" as water was released into the partially completed Friant-Kern Canal for the first time. More than three thousand people, mostly residents of the San Joaquin Valley, attended the ceremonies.

Operations and usage

Friant Dam's primary purpose is to capture the fluctuating flows of the San Joaquin River and divert the water for irrigation through the Friant-Kern and Madera Canals. In 1990, farmers who received their water from Friant Dam produced more than $1.9 billion worth of 90 different kinds of crops.

About , or 32.7% of the reservoir's regular capacity, is reserved for flood control between October and January to protect against rain floods, while between February and July, this is increased to  – 75.0% – to provide space for snowmelt floods. However, large snowmelt floods often exceed the capacity of the dam and reservoir and force larger releases downstream, potentially causing damage to riverside property and infrastructure.

The dam is also used to generate up to 25 megawatts (MW) of hydroelectric power. The penstock releasing water into the Friant-Kern Canal is fitted with a Kaplan turbine with a capacity of 15 MW, and the Madera Canal penstock is equipped with a smaller 8 MW turbine. The smallest hydroelectric generator, with a capacity of 2 MW, is located at the outlet works on the base of the dam and produces power from water releases that serve local farms along the San Joaquin River directly downstream from Friant Dam, as well as releases to a fish hatchery below the dam and for wildlife management purposes.

Expansion

Because of its relatively small storage capacity relative to the average annual discharge of the San Joaquin River –  versus  – Friant Dam often has to release excessive amounts of water that could be otherwise used for irrigation or power generation, also causing downstream damage. The increase in height would also allow for the generation of between 4.7–30.4 MW of additional power.

However, Temperance Flat has come under heavy controversy because it would flood a large scenic section of the San Joaquin River gorge, negatively affect wildlife in the river and inundate two upstream hydroelectric power plants, causing a net loss in power generation. The water supplied from such a dam would be very expensive, ranging from $1000–1500 per acre foot (area farmers currently pay about $60 per acre foot). Raising Friant Dam would likely produce similar increases in the cost of irrigation water.

Environmental impacts
The desiccation of the river has caused the degradation of large stretches of riverside habitat and marshes, and has nearly eliminated the historic chinook salmon run that once numbered "possibly in the range of 200,000 to 500,000 spawners annually". Reduction in flows has also increased the concentration of pesticide and fertilizer runoff in the river contributing to pollution that has further impacted aquatic species.

On September 13, 2006, after eighteen years of litigation, environmental groups, fisherman and the USBR reached an agreement on releasing part of the water currently diverted into the irrigation canals into the San Joaquin River in order to help restore the river and its native fish and wildlife. However, the river restoration project will cause a 12–20% reduction in irrigation water delivered from Friant Dam.

See also

Water in California
California Water Wars
List of dams and reservoirs in California
List of largest reservoirs of California
List of the tallest dams in the United States

References

Works cited

External links

Friant Water Authority
Live hydrologic data for Friant Dam

Buildings and structures in Fresno County, California
Buildings and structures in Madera County, California
Dams in California
Hydroelectric power plants in California
San Joaquin Valley
United States Bureau of Reclamation dams
Dams completed in 1942
Energy infrastructure completed in 1942
Dams on the San Joaquin River
Central Valley Project
1942 establishments in California